Frederick Kesler (1816–1899) was an early member of the Church of Jesus Christ of Latter-day Saints, Born in Meadville, Crawford Co., Pennsylvania. Son of Frederick Kesler and Mary Lindsay.  He married Jane Elizabeth Pratt (October 27, 1837 – November 23, 1912). He was baptized in 1835.  Kesler was a bodyguard of Joseph Smith, served as a major in the militia corps of the Great Salt Lake Military District, was a justice of the peace, and director of the penitentiary.  He was also a bishop for many years, major in the Nauvoo Legion, mill builder, and an associate of Brigham Young from Nauvoo.

See also
 Pratt family
 Kesler Peak

References

1850s in Utah Territory
American Latter Day Saints
Mormon pioneers
People of Utah Territory